Chitwan Higher Secondary School is the oldest government school in Chitwan District. It was established in 2011 BS (1954 AD). This school have 10+2 and offer bachelors level programs.

References

Secondary schools in Nepal
Chitwan District
Educational institutions established in 1954
1954 establishments in Nepal
Buildings and structures in Bharatpur, Nepal